Hussein Al-Shuwaish [حسين الشويش in Arabic] (born 1 November 1989) is a Saudi footballer who plays as a defender for Al-Fayha.

References

 

1989 births
Living people
Saudi Arabian footballers
Al-Rawdhah Club players
Al Nassr FC players
Hajer FC players
Al-Raed FC players
Al-Fayha FC players
Saudi First Division League players
Saudi Professional League players
Association football defenders
Saudi Arabian Shia Muslims